Charlottetown-Sherwood was a provincial electoral district for the Legislative Assembly of Prince Edward Island, Canada. It was created prior to the 2007 election from Stanhope-East Royalty, Sherwood-Hillsborough, Parkdale-Belvedere and Winsloe-West Royalty.

The district was replaced by Charlottetown-Winsloe.

Members
The riding has elected the following Members of the Legislative Assembly:

Election results

Charlottetown-Sherwood, 2007–2019

2016 electoral reform plebiscite results

References

 Charlottetown-Sherwood information

Politics of Charlottetown
Former provincial electoral districts of Prince Edward Island